Jeanne Larocque Blackburn was a politician in Quebec, Canada. She was a three-term Member of the National Assembly of Quebec.

Background

She was born on June 24, 1934 in Saint-Elzéar, Gaspésie–Îles-de-la-Madeleine and made career in education.

Member of the legislature

Blackburn successfully ran as the Parti Québécois candidate to the National Assembly of Quebec in 1985 in the district of Chicoutimi.  She was re-elected in 1989 and in 1994.

Cabinet Member

In 1994, Blackburn was appointed to Premier Jacques Parizeau's Cabinet. She served as Minister of Income Security and Minister responsible for the Status of Women until Lucien Bouchard took over as Premier in 1996.

Retirement

Blackburn served as chairperson for the Education Committee after 1996, but did not run for re-election in 1998.

Footnotes

1934 births
Living people
Women government ministers of Canada
Members of the Executive Council of Quebec
Parti Québécois MNAs
People from Gaspésie–Îles-de-la-Madeleine
Politicians from Saguenay, Quebec
Women MNAs in Quebec